The 153rd Pennsylvania House of Representatives District is located in Montgomery County and includes the following areas:

 Abington Township 
 Upper Dublin Township (PART)
 District 02 [PART, Division 03]
 District 04 [PART, Divisions 02 and 03]
 District 05

Representatives

References

Government of Montgomery County, Pennsylvania
153